The Bhal region is an area of Gujarat, India. It is spread across the political boundaries of the districts of Bhavnagar, Ahmedabad, and Anand. The Bhal region is situated on the deltas of the Sabarmati, Bhogawo, Bhadar, Lilka and other rivers that flow east and southeast off the Kathiawar peninsula into the Gulf of Cambay. The word Bhaal seems to have been derived from the Sanskrit word भाल which means forehead. Such a name is given to this region probably because it is mostly as flat as a forehead with almost entire region's soil without any stones, pebbles or gravel.

Bhalia Wheat is a major farm cultivation in the region.

Flowing through Bhal region

Bhada (Bhaadar)

Gautami

Ghelo
The Ghelo River starts near Babra in Amreli district and meets the Gulf of Cambay in the Bhal Region.

Kalubhar
The Kalubhar River starts near Babra in Amreli District and meets the Gulf of Cambay in the Bhal Region. The Rangholi River is a major tributary.

Lilka

Limdi no Bhogavo

Meshvo

Ootavali

Sabarmati
The Sabarmati River is at the northeastern end of the Bhal. The Vatrak River and the Bhogawo Rivers are major tributaries of the Sabarmati.

Surendranagar no Bhogavo

Wildlife and birds
 Velavadar Blackbuck National Park
 Pipli Wetland
 Saltpans & wetlands between Naari & Bawaliyali villages

Archaeological and historical sites
 Lothal
 Gamph

Gamph was a small state of India, ruled by chudasama Rajputs. There are 52 Estates of Chudasama Rajputs in the Dhandhuka area which all are the Bhayads of former Gamph state. These Rajputs are descended from the old Rah Dynasty of Junagadh.

Navaghana (late 11th century king), The King of Junagadh have 5 sons, Whom elder son Bhimji given the Jagir of Bhadli. Second son Satrasalji given the jagir of Sarva, later known as Sarvaiya rajputs on the name of village Sarva. Third and fourth son Devghanji and Savghanji given Osham Chorasi. Fifth son Raa Khengar succeeded him, his descendant Raa Bhupatsinhji of Junagadh was called as "Raizada" Mahommed Begda, Sultan of Ahemdabad so they are later known as Raizada Rajputs. Bhimjis descendants continued the main branch of chudasama. Later they moved to Bhal region. Raisalji established new capital Gorasu in 1572. His Grandson Amarsinhji abandoned Gorasu and established Gamph in 1633, it remained Capital of Chudasama Rajputs. In 1947, Vikramsinhji Manharsinhji Chudasama, The Thakore Saheb of Gamph merged his State into India.

Pilgrimage sites
 Gorasu - Chudasama Rajput's Sahayak Devi Khodiyar Mataji Temple 
 Bhadiyad - Chudasama Rajputs Kuldevi Bhavani Mataji Temple
 Arnej - Bootbhawani Mataji temple
Kauka  - Bootbhawani mataji temple+ Bapasitaram temple 
 Bawaliyali - Radha-Krishna temple
 Dholka - Kalikund tirth Jain Temple
 Ganpatipura - Swayambhu Ganpati Idol & temple + Swaminarayan Mandir
 Nani Boru - Lord Shiva Temple built by Prashnora Nagar Brahmin community
 Bhadiyad - Pir Mehmudshah Bukhari Dargah sarifh and mosque
 Varna-lord hanumanji temple
Gorad [Gohil Mitali State Bhayat] Rajput's Shahayak Devi Ma Kodiyar Temple
 Swaminarayan Temple "Dholera- Madanmohanji Maharaj","Budhej" and "Gorad" 
 Akru-Madhavanand Aashram

Fairs
 Urash Mubarak of Bhadiyad pir

Notable Rulers

Chudasama Rajput was notable rulers of Bhal, they came here from Junagadh. The Chudasama Rajputs moved their capital to Gamph. Gamph was a small princely state with 52 Estates, who are former Bhayads of the ruler of Gamph State.

Virbhadrasinhji Vikramsinhji Chudasama.

16th ruler of Gamph State and head of Chudasama Rajputs.

New projects coming in Bhal region
 Dholera International Airport
 Ahmedabad - Dholera - Bhavnagar six-lane expressway
 Gandhinagar - Ahmedabad - Dholera metro rail

See also 
Gandhinagar — Capital of Gujarat
Vibrant Gujarat

Notes and references

External links 
 Website about information on Bhaal region

Regions of Gujarat